David Kwaku Asamoah Gyasi (born 2 January 1980) is a British actor. His films include Cloud Atlas (2012) and Interstellar (2014). On television, he is known for his roles in the BBC series White Heat (2012) and Troy: Fall of a City (2018), the CW miniseries Containment (2016), and the Amazon Prime series Carnival Row (2019–2023).

Early life
Gyasi was born in Hammersmith, London, one of seven children to Ashanti Ghanaian parents who had arrived in England in 1966. They divorced when he was young. Gyasi grew up in Fulham and Hayes. He attended Bishopshalt School and completed his A Levels at East Berkshire College. He went on to study Drama at Middlesex University.

Career
Gyasi landed his first main television role as Jeremy Hands in the 2005 ITV comedy Mike Bassett: Manager, a follow-up to Mike Bassett: England Manager (2001), and his first major film role that same year in Michael Caton-Jones' Shooting Dogs. Gyasi appeared alongside Kit Harington in the 2008 National Theatre production of War Horse.

In 2012, Gyasi starred in the science fiction film Cloud Atlas and as young Victor (played by Hugh Quarshie later in the character's life) in the BBC Two historical drama White Heat. This was followed by roles in the BBC One television film The Whale (2013) and Christopher Nolan's Interstellar (2014), the latter of which earned him a Black Reel Award nomination for Best Breakthrough Performance. Gyasi was cast as the lead of The Interceptor, also on BBC One, but had to drop out due to a heel injury. The role was taken over by O. T. Fagbenle.

Gyasi starred as Major Alex "Lex" Carnahan in 2016 the CW miniseries Containment. He went on to portray Achilles in the 2018 BBC and Netflix adaptation of The Iliad, titled Troy: Fall of a City. From 2019 to 2023, he starred as Agreus in the Amazon Prime fantasy series Carnival Row. He also led the Western film Hell on the Border and appeared in Cold Blood, Maleficent: Mistress of Evil, and Come Away. He had a recurring role as Ben Chambers in series 3 of The A Word.

Personal life
Gyasi began dating his wife Emma (née Llaudes) during sixth form at East Berkshire College. They had their first child, a daughter Elèna who now acts. They married that year and later had their second child, a son Nathaniel. The family settled in a Buckinghamshire village. Gyasi is a practicing Anglican.

Filmography

Film

Television

Stage

References

External links
 

Living people
1980 births
21st-century English male actors
Alumni of Middlesex University
Black British male actors
British Anglicans
English male film actors
English people of Ashanti descent
English people of Ghanaian descent
English male television actors
Male actors from London
People from Fulham
People from Hammersmith
People from Hayes, Hillingdon